The following low-power television stations broadcast on digital or analog channel 9 in the United States:

 K09AI-D in Las Vegas, New Mexico
 K09BE-D in Ekalaka, Montana
 K09BG-D in Basin, Montana
 K09BI-D in Methow, Washington
 K09BX-D in Saco, Montana
 K09CJ-D in Cedar City, Utah
 K09DF-D in Juliaetta, Idaho
 K09DM-D in Cortez, Colorado
 K09DW-D in Ruth, Nevada
 K09DY-D in Westcliffe, Colorado
 K09EA-D in Ely & McGill, Nevada
 K09EP-D in Grants, etc., New Mexico
 K09ES-D in Cashmere, Washington
 K09FJ-D in Pioche, Nevada
 K09FK-D in Ursine, Nevada
 K09FL-D in Caliente, Nevada
 K09FQ-D in Thompson Falls, Montana
 K09HY-D in Glasgow, Montana
 K09IV-D in Plevna, Montana
 K09JG-D in Malta, Montana
 K09KJ-D in Tierra Amarilla, New Mexico
 K09LO-D in Cascade, Idaho
 K09LW-D in Martinsdale/Lennep, Montana
 K09MH-D in White Sulphur Springs, Montana
 K09MY-D in Polaris, Montana
 K09NH-D in Shungnak, Alaska
 K09NI-D in Mekoryuk, Alaska
 K09NK-D in Perryville, Alaska
 K09NO-D in Pilot Point, Alaska
 K09OT-D in Valdez, Alaska
 K09OV-D in Kotzebue, Alaska
 K09OW-D in Nome, Alaska
 K09OY-D in Colstrip, Montana
 K09PC-D in Grayling, Alaska
 K09PJ-D in Ouray, Colorado
 K09PL-D in Dingle, etc., Idaho
 K09PO-D in Chevak, Alaska
 K09QC-D in McGrath, Alaska
 K09QG-D in Chalkyitsik, Alaska
 K09QH-D in Kenai, Alaska
 K09QK-D in Karluk, Alaska
 K09QM-D in Nelson Lagoon, Alaska
 K09QP-D in Kake, Alaska
 K09QR-D in Gambell, Alaska
 K09QU-D in Togiak, Alaska
 K09QW-D in King Cove, Alaska
 K09QX-D in St. Michael, Alaska
 K09RA-D in Sand Point, Alaska
 K09RB-D in St. Paul, Alaska
 K09RC-D in Unalakleet, Alaska
 K09RE-D in St. George, Alaska
 K09RF-D in Eagle Village, Alaska
 K09RP-D in False Pass, Alaska
 K09SA-D in Koyuk, Alaska
 K09SD-D in Lemhi, etc., Idaho
 K09SG-D in Goodnews Bay, Alaska
 K09SL-D in Kotlik, Alaska
 K09SP-D in Igiugig, Alaska
 K09SR-D in Port Lions, Alaska
 K09SU-D in Hildale, etc., Utah
 K09TH-D in Gunnison, Colorado
 K09TK-D in Elfin Cove, Alaska
 K09TR-D in Kalskag, Alaska
 K09TT-D in Circle, Alaska
 K09TW-D in Venetie, Alaska
 K09TX-D in Kaltag, Alaska
 K09UP-D in Colville, Washington
 K09VC-D in Paisley, Oregon
 K09VL-D in Boyes & Hammond, Montana
 K09WB-D in Powderhorn, Colorado
 K09XK-D in Sheridan, Wyoming
 K09XL-D in Douglas, Wyoming
 K09XW-D in Palm Desert, etc., California
 K09XY-D in Coolin, Idaho
 K09YE-D in La Pine, Oregon
 K09YH-D in Scottsbluff, Nebraska
 K09YK-D in Durango/Purgatory, Colorado
 K09YO-D in Thomasville, Colorado
 K09YP-D in Mink Creek, Idaho
 K09YR-D in Harlowton, Montana
 K09YT-D in Sula, Montana
 K09YW-D in Leamington, Utah
 K09YZ-D in Beeville-Refugio, Texas
 K09ZA-D in Leavenworth, Washington
 K09ZB-D in Havre, Montana
 K09ZK-D in Long Valley Junction, Utah
 K09ZN-D in Blanding/Monticello, Utah
 K09ZO-D in Juab, Utah
 K09ZP-D in Sigurd & Salina, Utah
 K09ZQ-D in Marysvale, Utah
 K09ZR-D in Woodland & Kamas, Utah
 K09ZS-D in Gateway, Colorado
 K09ZT-D in Beaver, Utah
 K09ZU-D in East Price, Utah
 K09ZV-D in Helper, Utah
 K09ZW-D in Roosevelt, etc., Utah
 K09AAD-D in Sitka, Alaska
 K09AAF-D in Monterey, California
 KBCI-LD in Bonners Ferry, Idaho
 KBHO-LD in Richmond, Texas
 KBMN-LD in Houston, Texas
 KEBQ-LP in Beaumont, Texas
 KKCO in Paonia, Colorado
 KNPG-LD in Saint Joseph, Missouri
 KOPA-CD in Gillette, Wyoming
 KPDS-LD in Wolcott, Indiana
 KSDX-LD in San Diego, California
 KUBN-LD in Madras, Oregon
 KVVG-LD in Porterville, California
 KXLH-LD in Helena, Montana
 KXMN-LD in Spokane, etc., Washington
 W09AF-D in Sylva, North Carolina
 W09AG-D in Franklin, North Carolina
 W09AT-D in Fajardo, Puerto Rico
 W09CZ-D in Roslyn, New York
 W09DB-D in Williamsport, Pennsylvania
 W09DJ-D in Wilkes-Barre, etc., Pennsylvania
 W09DL-D in Mount Vernon, Illinois
 WBON-LD in Richmond, Kentucky
 WEQT-LD in Atlanta, Georgia
 WHCQ-LD in Cleveland, Mississippi
 WNGF-LD in Gouverneur, New York
 WNSH-LD in Nashville, Tennessee
 WOPI-CD in Kingsport, Tennessee/Bristol, Virginia
 WPVS-LD in Milwaukee, Wisconsin
 WRCX-LD in Dayton, Ohio

The following low-power stations, which are no longer licensed, formerly broadcast on digital or analog channel 9:
 K09AH in Aguilar, Colorado
 K09AK in Eagle Nest, New Mexico
 K09BJ-D in Entiat, Washington
 K09BQ in Helper, Utah
 K09BW in Forsyth, Montana
 K09CD in Rockville, Utah
 K09CL-D in Rock Island, Washington
 K09CS in Beaver, etc., Utah
 K09CX in Green River, Utah
 K09CY in Vernal, etc., Utah
 K09FF-D in Squilchuck St. Park, Washington
 K09FX in Circleville, Utah
 K09GK in White Bird, Idaho
 K09GW in Broken Bow, Nebraska
 K09HI in Jordan, etc., Montana
 K09HU in Hoehne, Colorado
 K09ID in Soda Springs, etc., Idaho
 K09IJ in La Barge, Wyoming
 K09JE in Palmer, Alaska
 K09JH in Mayfield, Utah
 K09JJ in Bloomfield, etc., New Mexico
 K09JR in Hazen, North Dakota
 K09KP in Toquerville, Utah
 K09LC in Hanksville, Utah
 K09LF in South Park, Wyoming
 K09LH in Manitou Springs, Colorado
 K09MG in Ridgecrest, etc., California
 K09MI in Jeffrey City, Wyoming
 K09MM in Paradise Valley, Nevada
 K09MO in Hatch, Utah
 K09MQ in Hanna, etc., Utah
 K09NE in Tatitlek, Alaska
 K09NF in Chitina, Alaska
 K09NG in Noatak, Alaska
 K09NV in Alton, Utah
 K09OK in Rosebud, etc., Montana
 K09OQ in Wrangell, Alaska
 K09OR in Cordova, Alaska
 K09OU in Petersburg, Alaska
 K09PD in Haines, Alaska
 K09PI in Happy Camp, etc., California
 K09PR in Nikolai, Alaska
 K09PX in Chistochina, Alaska
 K09QD-D in Huslia, Alaska
 K09QE-D in Larsen Bay, Alaska
 K09QF in Angoon, Alaska
 K09QI in Hydaburg, Alaska
 K09QJ in Mentasta Lake, Alaska
 K09QL-D in Allakaket, Alaska
 K09QN in Point Hope, Alaska
 K09QQ in Beaver, Alaska
 K09QY in Kaktovik, Alaska
 K09QZ in Kivalina, Alaska
 K09RD in Rampart, Alaska
 K09RG-D in Kongiganak, Alaska
 K09RH in Akutan, Alaska
 K09RK in Nikolski, Alaska
 K09RO in Teller, Alaska
 K09RS in Anaktuvuk Pass, Alaska
 K09RT in Nuiqsut, Alaska
 K09RV-D in Arctic Village, Alaska
 K09RY in Hughes, Alaska
 K09RZ in Shishmaref, Alaska
 K09SF in North Fork, etc., Wyoming
 K09SI in Cantwell, Alaska
 K09SK in Egegik, Alaska
 K09SN in Ivanof Bay, Alaska
 K09SO-D in Chignik Lagoon, Alaska
 K09SV in Stevens Village, Alaska
 K09SW in Tanunak, Alaska
 K09TE in Bettles, Alaska
 K09TI in Meyers Chuck, Alaska
 K09TM-D in Kakhonak, Alaska
 K09TQ in Manokotak, Alaska
 K09TU in Lake Louise, etc., Alaska
 K09TZ in Atkasuk, Alaska
 K09UA in Yakutat, Alaska
 K09UB-D in Whittier, Alaska
 K09UD in Akhiok, Alaska
 K09UE in Kasigluk, Alaska
 K09UF in Morro Bay, California
 K09VF in Samak, Utah
 K09VQ in Crescent City, California
 K09VW in Fish Lake Resort, Utah
 K09WJ in Escalante, Utah
 K09WP-D in Checkerboard, Montana
 K09XF in Henrieville, Utah
 K09XO-D in Homer, Alaska
 K09XS in Buena Vista & Salida, Colorado
 K09YJ in Mexican Hat, Utah
 K09YQ-D in Ketchikan, Alaska
 KMXT-LP in Kodiak, Alaska
 KRKG-LP in Lewiston, Missouri
 KUVU-LP in Eureka, California
 W09BB in Schroon Lake, New York
 W09CQ in Jamestown, Kentucky
 W09CT-D in Mathias, etc., West Virginia
 WWPS-LP in Hawley, Pennsylvania
 WWRP-LP in Tallahassee, Florida

References

09 low-power